Ernest Nelson Mobley (November 1, 1914 - March 10, 2009) served in the California State Assembly representing the 33rd District and 31st District from 1967 to 1976.  During World War II he served in the United States Army.

References

United States Army personnel of World War II
Republican Party members of the California State Assembly
1914 births
2009 deaths
People from Belmont County, Ohio